Rumyancho Goranov Radev (17 March 1950) is a former Bulgarian football goalkeeper.

He played mostly for Lokomotiv Sofia. With Bulgarian national team he participated at 1974 FIFA World Cup. He gained 34 caps for Bulgaria.

Honours

Club
 Lokomotiv Sofia
A PFG:
Winner: 1977–78
Bulgarian Cup:
Winner: 1981–82
 Levski Sofia
Bulgarian Cup:
Winner: 1970–71

References

External links 
 Profile at LevskiSofia.info

1950 births
Bulgarian footballers
Bulgarian expatriate footballers
Association football goalkeepers
1974 FIFA World Cup players
Bulgaria international footballers
PFC Spartak Pleven players
PFC Levski Sofia players
FC Lokomotiv 1929 Sofia players
First Professional Football League (Bulgaria) players
Living people
Sportspeople from Pleven
APOEL FC players
Aris Limassol FC players
Olympiakos Nicosia players
Cypriot First Division players
Expatriate footballers in Cyprus
Bulgarian expatriate sportspeople in Cyprus